Grega is a given name. Notable people with the name include:

Grega Benedik (born 1962), Slovenian alpine skier
Grega Bole (born 1985), Slovenian road bicycle racer
Grega Sorčan (born 1996), Slovenian footballer
Grega Žemlja (born 1986), Slovenian tennis player

See also
Grego (surname)